George Frederick "Ted" Regan (6 June 1915 – 9 July 1943) was an Australian rules footballer who played for Melbourne and Essendon in the Victorian Football League (VFL).

He was killed in action during an air raid in British Burma while serving with the RAAF.

Family
The son of George Augustus Regan (1881–1952), and Ethel Eva Regan (1883–1969), née Schofield, George Frederick Regan was born in Elsternwick, Victoria on 6 June 1915.

Education
Regan was educated at Brighton Technical School (1927—1929), at Melbourne High School (1930—1932) – where he was a classmate of "Bluey" Truscott – and at George Taylor and Staff's Coaching College, Collins Street, Melbourne (1933).

Having gained his Leaving Certificate in the December 1933 examinations, he went on to study accountancy in the evenings with E. Pyke and Hosking, Chartered Accountants, in Elizabeth Street, Melbourne.

Football
Regan usually played as a defender.

Brighton T.S.O.B. (VAFA)
Granted a permit in May 1934, he played for three seasons (1934—1936) with Brighton Technical School Old Boys Football Club in "A Section" of the Victorian Amateur Football Association (VAFA).

Melbourne (VFL)
Having played with the Melbourne Second XVIII in 1937, and having received a permit to play with the First XVIII, he played his first senior match for Melbourne, at full-back, in the opening round of the 1938 season, against Geelong, on 23 April 1938.

Essendon (VFL)

He transferred to Essendon in 1939, and played his first First XVIII game, against Geelong, on 5 August 1939.

Having badly injured his leg in his second match, against St Kilda on the following Saturday, he did not play in the last two games of the 1939 season. and for the entire 1940 season.

In his seventh, and last match for the Essendon FIrst XVIII he played in the 1941 VFL Grand Final – rather than, that is, playing in the Second XVIII team (in which he had played for the previous eight weeks), that won the Grand Final against Fitzroy 12.16 (88) to 9.17 (71), in an extremely rough match that descended into an all-in brawl at the final bell.

Selected as 19th man, he replaced Les Griggs at three-quarter time, and kicked one goal – an inaccurate Essendon, with one more scoring shot, lost to Melbourne 13.20 (98) to 19.13 (127).

Military service
A qualified accountant by profession, and having been employed by British Dominion Films, Ltd. for nine years, he enlisted with the RAAF on 15 August 1941, eventually gaining the rank of Flight Sergeant.

He undertook his basic training, under the auspices of the Empire Air Training Scheme (EATS), at the No.1 Initial Flying Training School RAAF at Somers, Victoria, and officially gained his "wings" as a pilot following extensive training in Rhodesia.

Following his training in Rhodesia, he went to India as a Blenheim bomber pilot.

Death
Regan was killed when his plane was shot down over British Burma on 9 July 1943. Piloting a Bristol Blenheim crewed by himself and Sergeants Gordon Rowan and Merville Smith, Regan was involved in a six-aircraft aerial raid on Ramree. During the raid, Regan's Blenheim took heavy flak, and started to emit black smoke. The Blenheim proceeded to catch fire, break off from the formation of planes, and crash into a hillside, exploding the plane and killing Regan, Rowan, and Smith in the process.

He has no known grave, and is commemorated at the Singapore Memorial at the Kranji War Memorial in Singapore.

See also
 List of Victorian Football League players who died in active service

Footnotes

References

 Holmesby, Russell and Main, Jim (2007). The Encyclopedia of AFL Footballers. 7th ed. Melbourne: Bas Publishing.
 Main, J. & Allen, D., "Regan, Ted", pp. 321–322 in Main, J. & Allen, D., Fallen – The Ultimate Heroes: Footballers Who Never Returned From War, Crown Content, (Melbourne), 2002. 
 Maplestone, M., Flying Higher: History of the Essendon Football Club 1872–1996, Essendon Football Club, (Melbourne), 1996. 
 Attestation Form for Persons Voluntarily Enlisted in the Militia Forces: George Frederick Regan (V90262), dated 6 July 1939, National Archives of Australia.
 World War Two Service Record: Flight Sergeant George Frederick Regan (409448), National Archives of Australia.
 Taylor, Percy, "Essendon are Proud of War Prowess of their Players", The Australasian, (Saturday, 20 May 1944), p.11.
 Victorian R.A.A.F. Casualties: Overseas: Missing, Believed Killed, The Age, (Monday, 9 August 1943), p.3.
 R.A.A.F. Casualties: Overseas: Previously Missing, Now Presumed Dead, The Argus, (Monday, 20 March 1944), p.5.
 Flight Sergeant George Frederick Regan (409448), Commonwealth War Graves Commission.
 Dunn, Peter (2015), "1 Initial Flying Training School RAAF", Australia @ War, 2005.

External links

 
 
 Ted Regan, at Demonwiki.

1915 births
1943 deaths
People educated at Melbourne High School
Australian rules footballers from Melbourne
Melbourne Football Club players
Essendon Football Club players
Aviators from Melbourne
Australian World War II pilots
Royal Australian Air Force personnel of World War II
Australian military personnel killed in World War II
Royal Australian Air Force airmen
People from Elsternwick, Victoria
Military personnel from Melbourne